The Texas Tornado is a 1928 American silent Western film directed by Frank Howard Clark and starring Tom Tyler, Frankie Darro and Nora Lane.

Cast
 Tom Tyler as Tom Jones 
 Frankie Darro as Buddy Martin 
 Nora Lane as Ellen Briscoe 
 Jack Anthony as Bill Latimer 
 Frank Whitson as Jim Briscoe 
 Bob Burns as Sheriff
 Bob Reeves as Henchman at Bank

References

Bibliography
 Pitts, Michael R. Western Movies: A Guide to 5,105 Feature Films. McFarland, 2012.

External links
 

1928 films
1928 Western (genre) films
American black-and-white films
Film Booking Offices of America films
Silent American Western (genre) films
1920s English-language films
1920s American films